Nazareth is a municipality located in the Belgian province of East Flanders. In 2021, Nazareth had a total population of 11,844. The total area is 35.19 km2 which gives a population density of 320 inhabitants per km2.

Etymology 
There are various hypotheses for the origin of the name "Nazareth", dated to a text of songs from 1259 CE. It is possible that Nazareth was named after the biblical city of Nazareth. It is also possible, but less likely, that Nazareth was originally a slip of the word magherhet (thinness).

History 

The community was first recorded in 1259.

Heraldry 

The arms of Nazareth is a composition of two family crests:

The first part is the arms of the family Rockolfing: three gold roses geknopt throat in the field, vert scrolled head and a shield charged with a throat depth and looking round lion of gold, tongued gules.

The second part is the escutcheon of the family Kervyn Volkaersbeke: saber in a twill together right in the head by an acorn, stemmed and browsed in two pieces, left in the mind of a six-pointed star, everything from gold and the one point eagle leg of silver.

Sights 

19th-century church (1861 – 1870)

References

External links

Official website 

Municipalities of East Flanders
Populated places in East Flanders